Julau may refer to:
Julau
Julau (federal constituency), represented in the Dewan Rakyat